Gymnobucco is a bird genus in the African barbet family (Lybiidae), which was formerly included in the Capitonidae and sometimes in the Ramphastidae (toucans).

It contains the following species:

 
Bird genera
Barbets
Taxa named by Charles Lucien Bonaparte
Taxonomy articles created by Polbot